Man – Woman Wanted is the English title of the Polish film Poszukiwany, poszukiwana, a comedy released in 1973, directed by Stanisław Bareja.

References
 Poszukiwany, poszukiwana  at filmpolski.pl
 Poszukiwany, poszukiwana at stopklatka.pl

1973 films
Cross-dressing in film
Polish comedy films
1970s Polish-language films
Films directed by Stanisław Bareja
1973 comedy films
1973 LGBT-related films